The second season of the German talent show The Voice Senior premiered on November 24, 2019 on Sat.1. The coaches were the duo Alec Völkel and Sascha Vollmer of the band The BossHoss, the singer and actress Yvonne Catterfeld, the singer Sasha Schmitz all returning for their second season and with the new coach singer Michael Patrick Kelly, replacing Mark Forster. Lena Gercke and Thore Schölermann returned for their second season as hosts.

Monika Smets was named the winner of the season on December 15, 2019; making her the first female winner, marking Sasha Schmitz's second win as a coach on The Voice Senior.

Coaches and hosts

On May 22, 2019, it was announced that Michael Patrick Kelly would not be returning as a coach on the ninth season of The Voice of Germany but instead will switch to coach on The Voice Senior, replacing Mark Forster. Sasha Schmitz, The BossHoss and Yvonne Catterfeld all returned for their second season as coaches.

Lena Gercke and Thore Schölermann also returned as hosts.

Teams
Colour key

Blind auditions
The auditions for the second season took place from February 2019 to March 2019 but not shown on television. The blind auditions was recorded from June 20 to June 21 2019 at Studio Adlershof in Berlin and was broadcast on Sundays from November 24 until December 1, 2019.

Color key

Episode 1 (November 24) 
The first blind audition episode was broadcast on November 24, 2019.

Episode 2 (December 1) 
The second and final blind audition episode was broadcast on December 1, 2019.

Sing offs
The sing offs was recorded on August 16, 2019 in Berlin and was broadcast on December 8, 2019.

Color key

Final
The Final was broadcast on December 15, 2019 and unlike the first season, will be broadcast entirely as a live show. Each coach has in his/her team 2 artists.

In the first round the coach decides which one act remains and the other act will then be eliminated. The final round is chosen the winner by the public at home by televoting.

Elimination chart

Overall
Color key
Artist's info

Result details

Team
Color key
Artist's info

Result details

Ratings

References

External links
 Official website on Sat1.de
 The Voice Senior on fernsehserien.de

2019 German television seasons
Senior 2